A green flash is an optical phenomenon.

Green flash may also refer to:

 Green Flash (film), a 2008 comedy-drama
 "Green Flash" (song), by the Japanese idol group AKB48
 Green Flash Brewing Company, a brewery in California, U.S.
 Green Flash Handicap, an American horse race